May Chidiac (born 20 June 1963) is a journalist and former Lebanese Minister of State for Administrative Development.

Chidiac is a former television journalist at the Lebanese Broadcasting Corporation (LBC) and one of the station's television anchors until an assassination attempt on her life.  She was one of the few critics of Syria's keeping troops stationed in Lebanon after the end of the Lebanese Civil War and charged that the Taif Accords stipulated that Syria withdraw from Lebanon.

On the day she was attacked, after the Cedar Revolution and Syria's troop withdrawal from Lebanon earlier that year, she hosted a talk show in which she criticized what she called Syria's continuous meddling in Lebanon's affairs and voiced fears of further violence ahead of the UN report on the death of the former prime minister, Rafik Hariri. On 3 February 2009, she announced her resignation on her LBC show Bi Kol Jor'a.

Assassination attempt
Chidiac was seriously injured on 25 September 2005, by a car bomb in Jounieh, Lebanon. The bomb which nearly killed her was a one-pound device, detonated as she entered her car. Her left leg below the knee was blown off and her hair and clothes were set on fire. She was in stable condition following the amputation of her severely injured left arm.  The blast was one of a series of bombings in Lebanon mostly targeting critics of Syria, but including the centrist Lebanese defense minister, Elias Murr.

According to reports obtained by the Committee to Protect Journalists, half a kilogram of explosives was placed in Chidiac’s Range Rover. The explosion blew off the driver-side door, which was recovered more than 30 feet away from Chidiac’s car.

One other journalist, Samir Kassir, and anti-Syrian politicians including George Hawi and Gebran Tueni, editor and publisher of the daily newspaper, An-Nahar, were killed in these attacks. After months of treatment and numerous surgeries in Beirut and Paris, May appeared on TV on 25 May 2006, defiant, smiling and promising to return to journalism. On 27 January 2006, Chidiac announced her candidacy for the vacated Maronite seat in Lebanon's Baabda-Aley district in a televised interview.

On 12 July 2006, May Chidiac returned to Beirut. Her first visit in Lebanon was to the shrine of Saint Charbel, in the Byblos region. This was the location where she spent the day before the attack on her life. She participated in a mass celebrated by the superior of the monastery, Fr. Tannous Nehme. In 2007, she published her biography, Le Ciel m'attendra (French for Heaven Can Wait)

Career
Chidiac was the Minister of State of the Administrative Reform of the government of Saad Hariri since January 31, 2019. On October 19, 2019, May Chidiac and her 3 others colleagues from the  Lebanese Forces resigned from the government after a third day of protests across the country against tax increases and alleged official corruption.
She was Professor of Journalism and Radio/Television at the Notre Dame University–Louaize (NDU) since 1997.
She is the Founder and President of the two NGOs; May Chidiac Foundation (MCF) and its affiliated Media Institute (MCF-MI) since 2011. The Foundation organizes two annual conferences. 
After over 220 people were killed and over 5,000 were wounded  in the  2020 Beirut explosion, the Lebanese Forces President Samir Geagea appointed Dr. May Chidiac as Head of the GROUND-0 Beirut Relief Committee, on August 6, 2020.

She was part of Women On The Front Lines (WOFL) Lebanon &WOFL MENA Chapter, Jordan.

She is the Founder of the Academy of Leadership & Applied Communication (ALAC), certified by the Lebanese government by the decree N° 2844/2016.
She was the Head of the Press Division at the Lebanese Embassy in Bern-Switzerland between 1989 and 1990. She was a real estate agent between 1994 and 1998.

She was the Producer and presenter of the prime time political talk show “Bi Kol Joraa” (With Audacity), in the “LBCI”, 2006 – 2009.
She hosted  the political Talk show “Nharkom Saiid”,1998 -2005
She was the Editor, reporter and News Anchor at LBC, 1985-2005., and Journalist on the radio “Free Lebanon”, 1991 -1993, and Journalist on the radio “Voice of Lebanon”, 1982 – 1985.

Publications
“Le Ciel M’attendra” (Heaven Can Wait) in 2007 awarded the “Prix Vérité” in Le Cannet, France.
“La Television Mise à Nu” (Influence of politics on the television scene) in 2014. The book was awarded the “Phoenix Prize” for literature.

Awards and honors
On 27 October 2006 May Chidiac received one of the three Courage in Journalism Awards presented by the International Women's Media Foundation. 

In June 2006, she received the "CRANS Montana Foundation Award" for Freedom of Expression offered by his Royal Highness Prince Albert De Monaco, Monte Carlo.

On 3 May 2006, UNESCO awarded the UNESCO/Guillermo Cano World Press Freedom Prize to May Chidiac in recognition of her courage in defending and promoting freedom of the press.

In December 2007, May Chidiac was honored in the frame of "She Made It" by the Museum of Television and Radio, New York City.

In April 2006, she received an Honorary Award, presented by his Royal Highness Prince Sheikh Mohammed Bin Zayed Al Nahyan, Crown Prince of Abu Dhabi.

On 3 May 2007, the former French president, Jacques Chirac awarded May Chidiac the Legion of Honour at the Elysée Palace in Paris. Chirac described Chidiac as a "symbol of free speech in Lebanon."

In March 2008, she was honored as a prominent and audacious figure in politics and journalism during the Olympe De Gouge event, at Montauban France. In December 2010, The "Prix Verité" ("Truth Prize") was awarded to Chidiac for Le Ciel M'attendra in 2007 in La Ville de Cannet, Cannes, France.

In 2010, Chidiac was named one of the International Press Institute's World Press Freedom Heroes.

Chidiac has participated in significant symposiums and colloquiums such as the UN's Resolution 1325 Symposium in Vienna, the University of Sidney Ideas Talk, the International Press Institute Congress in South Africa and Jordan, UNESCO International Colloquium in Beirut, and UNESCO's Global Forum on Media and Gender in Thailand, its former Regional Forum for Media Development, as well as its Symposium for Freedom of Expression.

In 2016, Chidiac was awarded with an honorary doctorate from the American University of Science and Technology.

See also
List of people who survived assassination attempts

References

External links
 Assassinations haunt the press, ifex.org; accessed 15 December 2015.
 UNESCO awards press freedom prize to Chidiac, unesco.org; accessed 15 December 2015.
 LBC interview with May Chidiac, memritv.org; accessed 15 December 2015.
 May Chidiac, the Ardent Champion, alwaref.org; accessed 15 December 2015.
 May Chidiac Foundation

1963 births
Lebanese amputees
Lebanese Maronites
Living people
Lebanese journalists
Lebanese women journalists
Politicians from Beirut
Terrorist incidents in Lebanon in 2005
Chevaliers of the Légion d'honneur
2005 crimes in Lebanon
Lebanese Forces politicians